Roel van de Sande (born 10 July 1987) is a Dutch professional footballer who plays as a midfielder for RKVV Best Vooruit.

External links
 Voetbal International profile 

1987 births
People from Best, Netherlands
Living people
Dutch footballers
Association football midfielders
FC Eindhoven players
TOP Oss players
Helmond Sport players
RKC Waalwijk players
OJC Rosmalen players
Eerste Divisie players
Derde Divisie players
Vierde Divisie players
Footballers from North Brabant